The Las Nubes Rainforest Preserve is a 145 hectare (360 acre) conservation reserve that is located an hour outside the city of San Isidro de El General, in San José Province, Costa Rica.

The property was donated to York University by Dr. Woody Fisher in 1998. The Faculty of Environmental Studies operates an eco-campus on the property that hosts classes and research projects.

References

External links

Nature conservation in Costa Rica
York University
1998 establishments in Costa Rica